Keeper of the Bees may refer to:

 The Keeper of the Bees (novel), a novel by Gene Stratton-Porter , the basis of several films
 The Keeper of the Bees (1925 film), an American film directed by James Leo Meehan
 The Keeper of the Bees (1935 film), an American film directed by Christy Cabanne
 Keeper of the Bees (1947 film), an American film directed by John Sturges